Mr. Clean is  a brand of household cleaner.

Mr. Clean may also refer to:

Music 
 "Mr. Clean", a song on the 1970 album Straight Life by Freddie Hubbard
 "Mr. Clean", a song on the 1978 album All Mod Cons by The Jam
 "Mr. Clean", a song on the 1994 album Same Old Tunes by Millencolin
 "Mr. Clean", a song on the 2001 album Lou's Blues by Lou Marini and the Magic City Jazz Orchestra
 "Mr. Clean", a song on the 2007 album Dedicated 2 the Oldies 2 by Mr. Capone-E
 "Mr. Clean", a song on Yung Gravy's EP of the same name

Other uses 
 Tyrone "Mr. Clean" Miller, a character played by Laurence Fishburne in Apocalypse Now 1979 film
 "Mr. Clean", a 1994 episode of Rugrats

See also 
 Carlos Sastre (born 1975), Spanish former road bicycle racer nicknamed "Don Limpio" (Mr. Clean in Spanish) for his reputation for not doping